Andrew Leipus (born 9 January 1970, Adelaide, Australia) is a physiotherapist. 

Since October 1999, he has worked for the Board of Control for Cricket in India as the physiotherapist of the Indian national cricket team.

Leipus retired at the end of 2004.  He was credited for substantially upgrading the Cricket team's medical conditions and treatment.  In addition to improving facilities and treatment options (he legendarily found on his first day that the team's first aid kit was out of Band-Aids), he encouraged the team to start training in gyms. These training sessions led to a great improvement in the team's fitness level and, eventually, its level of play.

In cricket-crazy India, Leipus became a media fixture whenever key players suffered injuries.  Media pressure is said to be one of the reasons Leipus declined to renew his contract. He was replaced by John Gloster. He is now contracted with the Indian Premier League team Rajasthan Royals as its physiotherapist
.
In 2017, he was named as physiotherapist of Multan Sultans in Pakistan Super League.

References

External links
Cricinfo page on Andrew Leipus

People from Adelaide
Australian cricket coaches
1970 births
Living people
Australian physiotherapists
Indian Premier League coaches
Coaches of the Indian national cricket team
Pakistan Super League coaches